Kymo may refer to:
 Kymo, a Greek island
 Kymo, or Cymo, one of the Nereids

KYMO may refer to:
 KYMO (AM), a radio station (1080 AM) licensed to East Prairie, Missouri, United States
 KYMO-FM, a radio station (105.3 FM) licensed to East Prairie, Missouri, United States

See also 
 Cymo (disambiguation)